Shrewsbury Town Football Club, a professional association football club based in Shrewsbury, Shropshire, England, was founded in 1886. They first played league football in the inaugural Shropshire & District League for the 1890–91 season; they finished the season as runners-up and also won the Welsh Cup for the first time in their fourth attempt. After five seasons in the Shropshire & District League, they were admitted to the Birmingham & District League in 1895; they won their first league championship in that league in 1923. In 1937 they moved to the Midland Football League where they won the league three times out of the seven seasons they participated in. In 1950 they joined The Football League competing in its Third Division North for one season before being transferred to the South equivalent for the rest of their time in the third division. Shrewsbury played in the Third Division South until 1958–59, when they were placed in the Fourth Division on League reorganisation. They gained their first promotion in the same season after finishing fourth. They remained in The Football League, albeit in different divisions, until they were relegated to the Football Conference in 2003. It was in the Conference where Shrewsbury achieved their first play-off success, when they beat Aldershot Town in a penalty shoot-out after a 1–1 draw after extra time at the Britannia Stadium to win promotion back into the newly renamed Football League Two. Since then Shrewsbury have remained in the Football League.

Shrewsbury's furthest FA Cup run saw them reach the sixth round twice, first in 1978–79 and then in 1981–82. The furthest they have reached in the EFL Cup is the semi-finals in the 1960–61 edition which was the inaugural staging of the competition. Shrewsbury first participated in the EFL Trophy in 1989; they were the runners-up in the 1996 and 2018 finals. Shrewsbury also took part in 41 editions of the Welsh Cup between 1886 and 1989 reaching the final nine times and winning the cup six times. They took part in three FA Amateur Cups reaching the quarter-finals in 1893–94, the second round in 1894–95 and the semi-finals in 1895–96. After their exit from the Football League in 2003 Shrewsbury were eligible to take part in the 2003–04 FA Trophy and were eliminated in the quarter-finals.

Key

Key to divisions
 Shropshire – Shropshire & District League
 Birmingham – Birmingham & District League
 Midland – Midland Football League
 Division 2 – Football League Second Division
 Division 3 – Football League Third Division
 Division 3N – Football League Third Division North 
 Division 3S – Football League Third Division South 
 Division 4 – Football League Fourth Division
 Conference – Football Conference
 League 1 – Football League One/EFL League One
 League 2 – Football League Two

Key to rounds
 EPR – Extra preliminary round
 PR – Preliminary round
 QR1 – First qualifying round, etc.
 IntR – Intermediate round
 Group – Group stage
 R1 – First round, etc.
 QF – Quarter-finals
 SF – Semi-finals
 RU(N) – Runner-up of the northern section
 RU – Runner-up
 W – Winner

Key to positions and symbols
  – Champions
  – Runners-up
  – Promoted
  – Relegated
  – Top or joint-top league scorer in Shrewsbury's division
  – Competition not eligible to enter
  – Shrewsbury did not enter the competition

Seasons

Notes

References
General
 
 
 

Specific

 
Shrewsbury Town